The submental glands (or suprahyoid) are situated between the anterior bellies of the digastric muscle and the hyoid bone.

Their afferents drain the central portions of the lower lip and floor of the mouth and the apex of the tongue.

Their efferents pass partly to the submandibular lymph nodes and partly to a gland of the deep cervical group situated on the internal jugular vein at the level of the cricoid cartilage.

See also
 Submental triangle

References

External links
 
 Image at umich.edu - must rollover
 Lymphatic drainage and fascial planes in the neck
 Diagram at Baylor College of Medicine 
 Non-Hodgkin's Lymphoma | Symptoms and Types
 Neck, Cervical Metastases, Detection: Overview, Anatomy of the Cervical Lymphatics, Classification of Cervical Node Groups

Lymphatics of the head and neck